Schizothyrioma is a genus of fungi in the family Dermateaceae. The genus contains 2 species.

See also
 List of Dermateaceae genera

References

External links
Schizothyrioma at Index Fungorum

Dermateaceae genera
Taxa named by Franz Xaver Rudolf von Höhnel